CAST may refer to:

Medicine
 Cardiac Arrhythmia Suppression Trial, a heart study in the 1980s
 Childhood-autism spectrum test, formerly the Childhood Asperger Syndrome Test
 Chronic addiction substitution treatment, a policy adopted in Vancouver Canada to reduce the harms of drug prohibition

Organizations
 CAST (company), a software intelligence company
 Canadian Air-Sea Transportable Brigade Group, a former organization in the Canadian military
 Carolina Actors Studio Theatre, a theater company in Charlotte, North Carolina
 Centre for Analysis of Strategies and Technologies, a Russian non-governmental organization which conducts research on arms trade and defense trends
 Certification Authorities Software Team, avionic certification harmonization 
 China Academy of Space Technology
 China Association for Science and Technology
 Coalition to Abolish Slavery and Trafficking, a Los Angeles-based anti-human trafficking organization
 College of Arts, Science and Technology, former name of the University of Technology, Jamaica
 Commercial Aviation Safety Team (CAST), an organization with the US FAA which provides safety recommendations for commercial aircraft
 Curriculum Advice and Support Team, former name of the Scottish Further Education Unit

Technology
 CAST tool, a program for testing software
 CERN Axion Solar Telescope, an experiment in astroparticle physics to search for axions from the Sun
 Computer-aided simple triage, computerized methods or systems that assist physicians
Computer-adaptive sequential testing, a type of multi-stage testing

Other
 CAST (gene), which encodes the protein calpastatin
 CAST (race), a fictional race of androids in the Phantasy Star series of video games

See also
 CAST-128, a block cipher in cryptography
 CAST-256, a block cipher in cryptography
 Cast (disambiguation)

de:CAST